Folk costumes from Podhale region - costumes wear by Highlanders (Gorals) in Polish area of the Tatra Mountains, Podhale region. Unlike other regional groups in Poland, Highlanders from Podhale wear traditional outfit (or its elements) on a daily basis. This type of outfit  is widely considered  one of the Polish national costumes.

Male attire 
The most important elements of male attire are: trousers (portki) and a coat (cucha) made of woollen broadcloth, a leather vest (serdak), moccasins (kierpce) and a belt (trzos, opaska), shirt (koszula) made of homespun flaxen cloth and a black felt hat.

Female attire 
Female attire has been changed through the 19th and 20th century and in mid-19th century consisted of a percale shirt with wide sleeves, a decorated corset made of fabric, a wide percale skirt with floral motif, a muslin apron (fartuch), boots with high soles, trinkets or coral necklaces around the neck and a muslin (or tybet, or woollen) scarf worn on the head or over the shoulders. Women also wear the same type of shoes as man do - kierpce.

Gallery

References 

Polish folklore
Tatra Mountains
Polish clothing
Carpathians
Folk costumes